The Guldbagge for Best Original Score is a Swedish film award presented annually by the Swedish Film Institute (SFI) as part of the Guldbagge Awards (Swedish: "Guldbaggen") to film composers working in the Swedish motion picture industry.

Winners and nominees 
Each Guldbagge Awards ceremony is listed chronologically below along with the winner of the Guldbagge Award for Best Original Score and the film associated with the award. In the columns under the winner of each award are the other nominees for best music.

2010s

2020s

See also 
 
 Academy Award for Best Original Score
 Saturn Award for Best Music

Notes and references

External links 
  
  
 

Score
Film awards for best score
Score
Awards established in 2011